Burning Heart Records is an independent record label formed in 1993 in Fagersta, Sweden, and currently based in Örebro. It has a close affiliation with Californian label Epitaph Records, who own the rights to distribute Burning Heart's output in North America. It also started a German office in Berlin in the end of 2003.

Burning Heart has proven very successful in launching European (especially Swedish) bands to a global audience. Their successes have included The Hives, Turbonegro, The (International) Noise Conspiracy, Millencolin, No Fun at All and Refused. The label focuses on punk music, but has also released rock, ska, noise and hip hop records.

Bands released on the label
These are some of the bands with albums released by Burning Heart Records.

 59 Times The Pain
 Asta Kask
 The Accidents 
 Bodyjar
 Bombshell Rocks
 Boysetsfire
 Booze & Glory
 Breach
 Chickenpox
 Division of Laura Lee
 Donots
 Flogging Molly
 Franky Lee
 Give Up the Ghost 
 Her Bright Skies
 Hell Is for Heroes 
 The Hives 
 Home Grown
 The (International) Noise Conspiracy
 Liberator
 Looptroop Rockers
 The Lost Patrol Band
 Kid Down
 Midtown
 Millencolin
 Moneybrother
 Monster
 Nasum
 Nine
 No Fun at All
 Parkway Drive
 Promoe
 Raised Fist
 Randy
 Refused
 Samiam
 Satanic Surfers
 Sounds Like Violence
 Turbonegro
 The Weakerthans

See also 
 List of record labels

References

External links
 Discogs site
 Info about this label on Punknews.org
 Info about this label at Musicbrainz.org

 
Swedish independent record labels
Punk record labels
Garage rock record labels
Experimental music record labels
Alternative rock record labels
Pop record labels
Ska record labels
Refused
Epitaph Records